Oladapo Fagbenle (born 12 February 1986), professionally known as Daps, is a Nigerian-born British artist, video director, and former NCAA athlete. He is best known for directing music videos for recording artists such as Migos, Stormzy, Iggy Azalea, Kendrick Lamar, Willie xo, Wizkid, 2 Chainz and Davido.

Career
Born to Nigerian parents, Daps begun his career within the media industry as a video producer in New York and London. Before this, he played collegiate basketball at Campbell University and Bellarmine University. Daps is also the brother of British actor, O-T Fagbenle, video producer, Luti Fagbenle, and basketball player Temi Fagbenle. Daps currently resides in Los Angeles, California.

Basketball
Daps began playing basketball in London, England, where he played for the Westminster Warriors. He then continued his athletic career in the United States where he attended The Master's School in Connecticut for one year. Daps received a scholarship to play basketball at Campbell University in North Carolina where he competed for two years and received his bachelor's degree. Daps then transferred to Bellarmine University where he played basketball for two more years and received his master's degree. Daps is also the older brother of WNBA Minnesota Lynx Centre Temi Fagbenle.

Entertainment career
Daps began his video production career in the fall of 2010 and began directing music videos in 2013. In 2016 he directed the video for "Bad and Boujee" for the Migos which went on to become a US number 1 and generated hundreds of millions of views. The video for the Daps-directed, critically acclaimed "T-Shirt" was released.

Music videography

References

External links
 

Living people
1986 births
Campbell Fighting Camels basketball players
Nigerian music video directors
Bellarmine Knights men's basketball players
Yoruba sportspeople
Sportspeople from Lagos
Nigerian emigrants to the United Kingdom
British expatriate basketball people
Black British sportspeople
British music video directors